Charles Cleveland Nutting (May 25, 1858 – January 23, 1927 in Iowa City, Iowa) was an American zoologist, born in Jacksonville, Illinois.  He graduated from Blackburn University (1880) and received the M. A. degree from the same institution in 1882.  He conducted various zoological expeditions—in Central America for the Smithsonian Institution (1882–84), in Florida (1885), on the Saskatchewan River (1891)—and was naturalist of the Albatross Hawaiian expedition in 1902.  He was professor of zoology and curator of the Museum of Natural History of the University of Iowa from 1886 to 1890 and thereafter was head of his department.  Nutting's most important publications are systematic papers dealing with marine hydroids, which appeared in the reports of the United States Commission of Fisheries and elsewhere and were reprinted, especially American Hydroids (part i, 1900; part iii, 1915). In this work Nutting described 124 new species and beautifully illustrated his monograph on American hydroids.

He is commemorated in the names of a number of animals, including Nutting's flycatcher Myiarchus nuttingi and the Nicaraguan seed-finch Oryzoborus nuttingi.

As museum director, Nutting was successful in attracting support from donors, politicians, university students and the public. He organized and lead expeditions to exotic destinations, always bringing home specimens, photographs and stories to his supporters.

Publications 
 1900-15. The American hydroids. Smithsonian Institution. United States National Museum. Special bulletin. 3 vols. Washington: Govt. Print. Off.

Notes

Sources 
 University of Iowa Natural History Museum: Our first 100 years.

 This article incorporates text from the second edition of The New International Encyclopedia vol. 17 (1916): p. 316.

1858 births
1927 deaths
University of Iowa faculty
American curators
American zoologists
American naturalists
People from Jacksonville, Illinois